Acacia atkinsiana, commonly known as Atkin's wattle, is a shrub belonging to the genus Acacia and the subgenus Juliflorae endemic to Australia. The indigenous peoples of the area where the shrub is found, the Kurrama peoples, know the shrub as Bilari or Pilarri.

Description
It mostly has a "V"-shaped habit but is sometimes rounded shrubs and generally has three to six main stems but is sometimes single-stemmed and with a spindly habit. The rounded and moderately dense crown is open but sometimes bushy when regrowing. The smooth, mid-grey to dark grey coloured bark can be longitudinally fissured on main stems bases. The phyllodes are rigid and erect to ascending, generally straight but sometimes shallowly incurved with numerous parallel longitudinal nerves. It blooms from December to March or May to July producing spherical yellow flowers. The simple inflorescences form scattered flower-heads over the plant. The grey-brown pods are thin and crusty and straight to shallowly curved.

Taxonomy
The species was first formally described by the botanist Bruce Maslin in 1982 as part of the work Studies in the genus Acacia (Leguminosae: Mimosoideae). Acacia species of the Hamersley Range area, Western Australia as published in the journal Nuytsia. It was reclassified as Racosperma atkinsianum by Leslie Pedley in 2003 then transferred back to genus Acacia in 2006. Acacia atkinsiana is closely allied to Acacia rhodophloia. The specific epithet honours Ken Atkins who provided field data for this and other specimens of Acacia from around the Pilbara during the 1980s.

Distribution
It is native to an area of the Pilbara region of Western Australia from around Newman and Karratha. It grows in loam or on rocky ground and is found on plains, low rises and ironstone hills. There are a few isolated occurrences to the south in the Gascoyne region within the catchment of the Ashburton River. In the Pilbara the bulk of the population is situated between the central parts of the Hamersley Range in the east extending west to the North West Coastal Highway east of Onslow. It is often part of spinifex plain communities and open shrubland often with Acacia ancistrocarpa and Acacia bivenosa. It often forms dense, pure stands usually in disturbed areas including verges and  burnt out areas having regenerated swiftly from seed.

See also
List of Acacia species

References

atkinsiana
Acacias of Western Australia
Plants described in 1982
Taxa named by Bruce Maslin